Steinfeld is a village and a former municipality in the Rostock district, in Mecklenburg-Vorpommern, Germany. Since 1 January 2013, it is part of the municipality Broderstorf.

References

Former municipalities in Mecklenburg-Western Pomerania